Ásgeir Trausti Einarsson (born 1 July 1992) is an Icelandic singer-songwriter and musician. In his Icelandic releases, he was credited as Ásgeir Trausti. In 2013, he started using the mononym Ásgeir as his recording name. He performs with his own band, the Ásgeir Trausti Band. He also plays guitar in the Icelandic band The Lovely Lion.

Career
Ásgeir's debut album Dýrð í dauðaþögn was released in 2012. The lead single, "Sumargestur", made it to number two on the Tónlist, an unofficial but widely quoted Icelandic Singles Chart, followed by the single "Leyndarmál" (six weeks at number 1 on Tónlist) and the title track "Dýrð í dauðaþögn" from the album (three weeks at #1 on Tónlist).

He had a Christmas hit with his song "Hvítir skór" in collaboration with Blaz Roca. The single stayed at the top of the Icelandic Singles Chart for 9 consecutive weeks from December 2012 to the end of January 2013.

An English language version of Dýrð í dauðaþögn under the title In the Silence had been scheduled for international release on 27 January 2014, but was made available online on iTunes on 28 October 2013. The American singer John Grant helped with the translation of the lyrics and re-production of the English language album. Based on online sales, the album has already charted in Belgium and Netherlands.

On 13 August 2013, Ásgeir released the video for "King and Cross", the debut single from the prospective album with John Grant appearing in the single release. The follow-up single "Going Home" charted in France. The main release to coincide with the release of the album was "Torrent", an English-language version of "Nýfallið regn".

In 2019, he released the single "Youth" from his third album Bury the Moon, which was released on February 7, 2020, on One Little Indian Records. It was the artist's first double album as he also released Bury the Moon's Icelandic counterpart, Sátt, on the same day.

In 2021, he released 4-track EP The Sky Is Painted Gray Today on September 3. In 2022, he announced his fourth studio album, Time On My Hands, which will be released on October 28. It was preceded by the first single "Snowblind" on July 14.

Tour
During the 2014 North American tour, Ásgeir performed songs both in English and Icelandic.

Discography

Studio albums

EP

Live albums

Singles

Iceland

*Positions on Tónlist, an unofficial Icelandic Singles Chart, but indicative of relevant popularity and chart success

Collaborations

*Positions on Tónlist, an unofficial Icelandic Singles Chart, but indicative of relevant popularity and chart success

International

Videography
 2013: "King and Cross"  (written, filmed and directed by Arni & Kinski)
 2013: "Torrent"  (directed by Jónatan Grétarsson)

Awards and nominations

References

External links
  – official site
 

1992 births
Asgeir Trausti
Asgeir Trausti
Asgeir Trausti
One Little Independent Records artists
Living people